Silver Beach is the name of:

 several locations:
Silver Beach, Bronx, an area of the Throggs Neck neighborhood of the Bronx, a borough of New York City
Silver Beach, New Jersey, a beach in Toms River Township
Silver Beach Amusement Park, former amusement park in Michigan
Silver Beach (India), a beach in Tamil Nadu on the south eastern coast of India
Silver Beach (New South Wales), a beach on Botany Bay in Sydney